Hamed Bahiraei (born 12 July 1995) is an Iranian footballer who played as an defensive midfielder for Machine Sazi.

Club career statistics 

Last Update:17 May 2016

References

Sepahan S.C. footballers
Nassaji Mazandaran players
1995 births
Living people
Iranian footballers
Association football midfielders